LBJ School may refer to:

 Lyndon B. Johnson School of Public Affairs, a graduate college of the University of Texas
 Lyndon B. Johnson High School (Austin, Texas), USA
 Lyndon B. Johnson High School (Johnson City, Texas), USA
 Lyndon B. Johnson High School (Laredo, Texas), USA

See also
 LBJ (disambiguation)